Erick Andrés Wiemberg Higuera (born June 20, 1994) is a Chilean footballer who currently plays for Chilean club Colo-colo as a left-back.

Club career

Deportes Valdivia
He began his career playing for Deportes Valdivia at the Segunda División, the third level of the Chilean football. Along with Valdivia, he obtained the promotion to the Primera B after winning the 2015-16 season. Playing at the Primera B, he stayed at the club until July 2020 - loaned to Unión La Calera during 2019 season - solving a judicial conflict with It.

Unión La Calera
On 2019 season, he played on loan from Valdivia at the cement club in Primera División, appearing also in three Copa Sudamericana matches against Chapecoense and Atlético Mineiro.

After a contract conflict between Deportes Valdivia and Unión La Calera, he played for Valdivia during the first half of the 2020 Primera B, going back to La Calera in July 2020.

International career
After being called up to training microcycles of the Chile senior team by both Reinaldo Rueda and Martín Lasarte, he made his international debut at the friendly match against Bolivia on March 26, 2021.

Honours

Club
Deportes Valdivia
 Segunda División (1): 2015–16

References

External links
 

Living people
1994 births
People from Valdivia
Chilean footballers
Chile international footballers
Segunda División Profesional de Chile players
Primera B de Chile players
Chilean Primera División players
Deportes Valdivia footballers
Unión La Calera footballers
Colo-Colo footballers
Association football defenders